Leon the Pig Farmer is a 1992 British comedy about a Jewish estate agent in London who discovers that thanks to an artificial insemination mishap, his real father owns a pig farm in Yorkshire. It was directed by Vadim Jean and Gary Sinyor, and starred Mark Frankel in the title role.

The film won the FIPRESCI International Critics' Prize at the 1992 Venice Film Festival, while its directors won the Best Newcomer award from the London Critics' Circle, the Most Promising Newcomer at the Evening Standard British Film Awards, and the Chaplin Award for the best first feature from the Edinburgh International Film Festival.

Plot
Jewish estate agent Leon Geller, who lives in London, discovers his father is not actually local businessman Sidney Geller but Yorkshire Dales pig farmer Brian Chadwick.

Cast
Source:
 Mark Frankel as Leon Geller
 Janet Suzman as Judith Geller
 Brian Glover as Brian Chadwick
 Connie Booth as Yvonne Chadwick
 David de Keyser as Sidney Geller
 Maryam D'Abo as Madeleine
 Gina Bellman as Lisa
 Vincent Riotta as Elliot Cohen
 Jean Anderson as Mrs. Samuels
 John Woodvine as Vitelli
 Annette Crosbie as Dr. Johnson
 Stephen Greif as Doctor
 Burt Kwouk as Art Collector
 Sean Pertwee as Keith Chadwick
 Bernard Bresslaw as Rabbi Hartmann

References

External links
 

1992 comedy films
1992 films
British comedy films
Films directed by Vadim Jean
Films scored by John Murphy (composer)
Films about Jews and Judaism
Films set in Yorkshire
Films directed by Gary Sinyor
1992 directorial debut films
1990s English-language films
1990s British films